Gomul refers to a number of powdered coatings, toppings, fillings, or dips in Korean cuisine.

Uses 
Gomul is used to improve the appearance and taste of tteok (rice cake), including injeolmi, danja, and gyeongdan, as well as between-layer fillings for siru-tteok (steamed rice cake).  It helps with even cooking of steamed rice cakes, being the less dense layer (compared to the rice flour layer, which tend to turn stickier as it steams) through which steam passes more easily.

Gomul is also used for topping bingsu (shaved ice). Sometimes, soybean gomul is served with grilled samgyeopsal (pork belly), with meat dipped in the soybean powder when eaten.

Varieties and preparation 
Red bean or mung bean gomul is used in winter, while soybean or sesame gomul, which don't spoil as fast, are preferred in summer.

Common varieties and their preparation are:
 Bam-gomul ("chestnut strands/flakes or powder") – chestnuts are shelled and sliced into thin strands or flakes. Alternatively, they can be cooked, shelled, mashed, and sieved through a coarse strainer into powder.
 Daechu-gomul ("jujube strands/flakes") – jujubes are peeled, and the skin part is sliced into thin strands or flakes.
 Dongbu-gomul ("cowpea powder") – the white gomul is made with cowpeas.
 Geopipat-gomul ("hulled red bean powder") – to make the white gomul, red beans (often the black cultivar) are ground in a millstone, soaked in lukewarm water for five to six hours, husked, and steamed in siru. When properly cooked, the beans are salted, mashed, sieved, and pan-fried without oil over a low heat.
 Kkae-gomul ("sesame powder") – sesame is washed, husked, pan-fried without oil, and used whole or coarsely ground with mortar and pestle.
 Heugimja-gomul ("black sesame powder") – black sesame is prepared in the same way as for sesame.
 Kong-gomul ("soybean powder") – the yellow gomul is made by washing, draining, and roasting soybeans, then mashing them with ginger, garlic, and salt. It is then sieved to desired fineness: coarse kong-gomul usually used to coat injeolmi, and coarse kong-gomul to fill and top siru-tteok.
 Nokdu-gomul ("mung bean powder") – the pale yellow gomul is made with mung beans in the same way that geopipat-gomul is made. 
 Pat-gomul ("red bean powder") – to make the dark red gomul, unhusked red beans are boiled in three parts water, drained when 80% cooked, and let steam for a long time. When properly cooked without excess moisture, it is salted and mashed.
 Seogi-gomul ("rock tripe strands/flakes") – rock tripe is sliced into thin strands or flakes.

Gallery

References 

Food and drink decorations
Korean cuisine